Paula Shaw (born July 17, 1941) is an American actress. A life member of the Actors Studio, Shaw has portrayed characters in numerous films and on television (including a role as prostitute on Barney Miller, season three, "Quarantine", and season four,  "Bugs"). She is perhaps most well known for portraying the character of Mrs. Pamela Voorhees in the Freddy vs. Jason movie. She lives in Vancouver, British Columbia, Canada.

Selected filmography

References

External links

 
 Where Are They Now?

1941 births
American expatriate actresses in Canada
American film actresses
American television actresses
Living people
Actresses from New York City
21st-century American women